Shrooms may refer to:

 Mushrooms
 Or specifically psilocybin mushrooms
 Shrooms (film), a 2007 horror film
 Super Mushroom, a power-up item in the Super Mario series